Victor Santos (born 27 June 1997) is a Brazilian cross-country skier. He competed in the 2018 Winter Olympics.

Cross-country skiing results
All results are sourced from the International Ski Federation (FIS).

Olympic Games

World Championships

World Cup

Season standings

References

1997 births
Living people
Cross-country skiers at the 2018 Winter Olympics
Brazilian male cross-country skiers
Olympic cross-country skiers of Brazil
21st-century Brazilian people